Alexandra "Alex" Hurst (born 25 November 1994) is an association football defender and midfielder from Northern Ireland who played for the national football team from 2011–2015.  She played for Newry City Ladies F.C., Swindon Town L.F.C.,  and Bristol City W.F.C.

References

External links 
 

1994 births
Living people
Women's association footballers from Northern Ireland
Northern Ireland women's international footballers
Women's association football defenders
Women's association football midfielders
Newry City Ladies F.C. players
Bristol City W.F.C. players